As of March 2022, there are 209 active VTubers operating under Nijisanji, their various overseas branches, and partnered programs. Members in italics have ceased their streaming activities.

NIJISANJI

NIJISANJI (2018 Wave)

NIJISANJI First Generation
Nijisanji 1st gen 8 original members started recruiting auditions on January 11, 2018, and announced their official debut on February 8, 2018.

NIJISANJI Second Generation
Nijisanji 2nd gen 9 original members started recruiting auditions on February 22, 2018, and announced their official debut on March 15, 2018, with 1 Secret member.

Original Members

Secret Member

NIJISANJI Gamers
Nijisanji Gamers was born as a group specializing in live game play distribution, was later merged with the first Nijisanji group and Nijisanji SEEDS on December 31, 2018, becoming a single group name Nijisanji.

Gamers First Wave

They were debuted on May 2, 2018.

Gamers Second Wave

They were debuted on July 6, 2018.

 (retired June 27, 2019)

Gamers Third Wave

They were debuted on July 30, 2018.

 (retired October 30, 2019)

NIJISANJI SEEDs
Nijisanji SEEDs was born as a challenge group that should be the Nijisanji third generation, was later merged with the first Nijisanji group and Nijisanji Gamers on December 31, 2018, becoming a single group name Nijisanji.

NIJISANJI SEEDs First Generation 
Nijisanji SEEDs 1st gen 8 original members started recruiting auditions on May 8, 2018, and announced their official debut on June 3, 2018, with 5 Secret members.

Original Members

 (retired April 9, 2019)
 (retired May 31, 2019)
 (retired October 31, 2020)

Secret Members
 (retired May 7, 2019)

NIJISANJI SEEDs Second Generation 

SEEDs Second Generation First Wave

They were debuted on August 9, 2018.

 (retired December 31, 2018)

 (transferred from VOIZ)

SEEDs Second Generation Second Wave

They were debuted on August 31, 2018.

 (retired January 13, 2020)

 (retired March 31, 2020)

SEEDs Second Generation Third Wave

They were debuted on September 25, 2018.
 (transferred from VOIZ)

VOIZ 
Originally created on June 8, 2018, as an all-male group focusing on music and voice drama, the group was quickly disbanded August 9, 2018 with two of its members transferred into SEEDS (which later merged into the main branch by the end of the year).

 (transferred to SEEDs 2nd gen 1st wave)
 (transferred to SEEDs 2nd gen 3rd wave)
 (withdrawal on June 30, 2018)
 (withdrawal on June 30, 2018)

NIJISANJI (2019 Wave) 

Debuted on January 8, 2019
 (retired April 30, 2022)
 (retired August 31, 2019)
Debuted on January 17, 2019: Usa-chan club

Debuted on January 28, 2019

Debuted on March 8, 2019
 (terminated March 12, 2019)
 (retired March 10, 2021)
Debuted on March 22, 2019: Sanbaka

Debuted on April 2, 2019: Beni zuwaigani

Debuted on April 29, 2019
 (retired June 30, 2021)

Debuted on May 17, 2019

Debuted on June 19, 2019

Debuted on July 3, 2019: SMC-gumi

Debuted on July 24, 2019: Blues
 (retired July 28, 2022)

Debuted on August 8, 2019: Posanke

Debuted on September 19, 2019: Tulip-gumi

Debuted on October 17, 2019: Orihimeboshi

Debuted on October 31, 2019: Aka no Soshiki

Debuted on November 28, 2019: Night Kingdom

Debuted on December 26, 2019: Mananatsu

NIJISANJI (2020 Wave) 
Debuted on January 30, 2020: Meifu

 (retired May 31, 2022)

Debuted on April 2, 2020: VΔLZ

Debuted on June 30, 2020
 (terminated October 19, 2020)

Debuted on August 6, 2020: Sereine Jogakuin

NIJISANJI (2021 Wave) 
Debuted on July 19, 2021: Eden-gumi
 (retired November 30, 2022)

NIJISANJI (2022 Wave) 
Debuted on March 20, 2022: Ranunculus

Debuted on May 21, 2022

Debuted on July 13, 2022: VOLTACTION

NIJISANJI (2023 Wave)
Debuted on January 19 to 20, 2023: Idios

NIJISANJI ID
Nijisanji expanded its operational area to Indonesia under the name Nijisanji ID from July 19, 2019, and started auditioning.  Nijisanji ID and KR merged with the main Nijisanji group on April 15, 2022.

ID First Wave: 3setBBQ

(read: San-set Barbeque) They were debuted on September 15, 2019.

ID Second Wave: CloverMcOver

They are debuted on December 18, 2019.

 (retired November 27, 2022)

ID Third Wave: LAN_NEE3S

(read: Lan Nee-Sans) They were debuted on March 13, 2020.

ID Fourth Wave: 3FicLite

They were debuted on August 7, 2020.

ID Fifth Wave: 53renade

Work closely with local illustrators and Live2D, they were debuted on November 11, 2020.

ID Sixth Wave: 6WS

They were debuted on July 28, 2021.

NIJISANJI KR
Nijisanji KR (Nijisanji South Korea) merged with the main Nijisanji group in April 2022.

KR First Wave
Wiffy
Yu Ruri
Shin Yuya
Min Suha

KR Second Wave: Arashi Unagi
Lee Siu
So Nagi
Chae Ara

KR Third Wave: Neiro wa Murasaki
Akira Ray
Lee Roha
Nun Bora

KR Fourth Wave
Oh Jiyu
Shin Kiru
Yang Nari
Ryu Hari

KR Fifth Wave: Mianhada Pinaya
Seffyna
Ban Hada
Song Mia

KR Sixth Wave
Ko Yami
Ha Yun
Na Sera
Lee On

KR 1.5 Wave

These members were formerly part of an agency named 541 E&C, which merged with Nijisanji KR on 25 January 2020.
Moarin
Gaon
Kaen
Lorou
Han Chiho
Hakuren

NIJISANJI NetWORK 
VTuber community service provided by "Nijisanji Project" from May 10, 2019, to December 31, 2019. The two former members of this program are still active VTubers but they are no longer officially affiliated with Nijisanji.

NIJISANJI IN
Was temporary rebranded as Nijisanji EN (Nijisanji English) before reverting to Nijisanji IN. The branch operation was suspended on 30 April 2021 and all members retired at the same time.
Aadya
Noor
Vihaan

NIJISANJI EN
The second group to be named Nijisanji English after the rebranded Nijisanji India.

EN First Wave: LazuLight
Pomu Rainpuff
Elira Pendora
Finana Ryugu

EN Second Wave: OBSYDIA
Rosemi Lovelock
Petra Gurin
Selen Tatsuki

EN Third Wave: Ethyria
Nina Kosaka
Millie Parfait
Enna Alouette
Reimu Endou

EN Fourth Wave: Luxiem
Luca Kaneshiro
Shu Yamino
Ike Eveland
Mysta Rias
Vox Akuma

EN Fifth Wave: Noctyx
Sonny Brisko
Uki Violeta
Alban Knox
Fulgur Ovid
Yugo Asuma (released December 14, 2022)

EN Sixth Wave: ILUNA
Kyo Kaneko
Maria Marionette
Aster Arcadia
Aia Amare
Ren Zotto
Scarle Yonaguni

EN Seventh Wave: XSOLEIL
Zaion LanZa (terminated March 10, 2023)
Doppio Dropscythe
Meloco Kyoran
Hex Haywire
Kotoka Torahime
Ver Vermillion

VirtuaReal
VirtuaReal is a branch of Nijisanji that was created in partnership with the Chinese media site, Bilibili. Apart from their VTubers/VUP's (what VTubers are called in Chinese), VirtuaReal has two producers named Tokimori Seisa and Prototype VR.

VR First Generation
Eine
Ruki

VR Second Generation

Ichigo (terminated)
Kouichi

VR Third Generation
Muri
Hanon

VR Fourth Generation
Plus
Nyatsuki
Waku

VR Fifth Generation
Miki
Mahiru
Hoshimi

VR Sixth Generation
Aza
Yagi
Tabibito
Roi

VR Seventh Generation
Seiya
Saya
Yukie

VR Eighth Generation
Karu
Samael
Mimoi (terminated)
Shiki
Pax

VR Ninth Generation
Chaos
Kiyora
Chiharu

VR Tenth Generation
Reve
Sirius
Yua
Shaun

VR Eleventh Generation
Tanoshiba
Mari
Chiyuu
Imi

VR Twelfth Generation
Mayumi
Kendou
Tsukumo
Remi

VR Thirteenth Generation
Tocci
Kiti
Qilou (deceased)

VR Fourteenth Generation
Koxia
Hakuja
Yomiya
Rhea
Miyu

VR Fifteenth Generation
Yog
Keke
Hunger
Uka

VR Sixteenth Generation
Sybil
Girimi
Karisa
Kiyuu

VR Seventeenth Generation
Leo
Era
Sui

VR Eighteenth Generation
Eve
Shiori
Opal

VirtuaReal Star
Members of VirtuaReal Star are the VTuber identities of popular, pre-established Chinese content creators and celebrities on Bilibili.

 - Identity: Ling Yuan Yousa, singer and Vocaloid producer
Sakura Haruka - Identity: Ruanruanbing, MC and vlogger
Nanako - Identity: Cai Ming, actress
Zuya Naxi
Hanser
 -  Identity: Zhang Ye, Dubbing Director and vocal actress

VirtuaReal Link
VirtuaReal Link is similar to the former Nijisanji NetWORK partnership program such that independent VTubers are given technical support from Ichikara Inc. "Super Virtual High School" (SVHS) is the unit name for four members.

Andou Inari
KINGSK科科
Mitsusa
Lynn (SVHS)
Eli (SVHS)
Muse (SVHS)
Seven (SVHS)
Suzukaze Suzuka

Sumire Hina
Mama Mara
Prime Star(Terminated)
Karon
Isabella
Azusa

Jinxy

Ruruna
Mori
Miyazono Rin
Syo
Susam
Noi
Nox
Joi

See also 
 Nijisanji

References 

Nijisanji
VTubers